Wang Fengying (born Oct. 1970) is a Chinese businesswoman, and the CEO and deputy chairman of Great Wall Motor.

Wang Fengying was born in Baoding in Hebei province in the north of China.

In 1991, Wang earned a bachelor's degree from the Tianjin Institute of Finance, followed by a M.Sc. (majoring Finance) in 1999.

Wang joined Great Wall Motor in 1991, aged 21. In 2003, she became the chief executive (CEO) of Great Wall Motor.

In 2017, she was assessed as being the 62nd most powerful woman in the world by Forbes. In March 2018, speaking to the National People's Congress, she presented her views about the Great Wall Motor's aim to double their vehicle sales by 2025 to 2 million units annually, helped by the push from increased electric and hybrid plug-in car production.

References

Living people
Businesspeople from Baoding
Chinese chief executives
1970 births
21st-century Chinese businesswomen
21st-century Chinese businesspeople
Great Wall Motors people
Automotive businesspeople